Chignecto Bay is an inlet of the Bay of Fundy located between the Canadian provinces of New Brunswick and Nova Scotia and separated from the waters of the Northumberland Strait by the Isthmus of Chignecto. It is a unit within the greater Gulf of Maine Watershed. Chignecto Bay forms the northeastern part of the Bay of Fundy which splits at Cape Chignecto and is delineated on the New Brunswick side by Martin Head. Chignecto bay was also the site of an unsuccessful railway and canal project of the 1880s and 1890s that would have intersected the landmass, thereby providing a transit passage between New England and Prince Edward Island. After several investigations into the feasibility of a new canal project, including most importantly by the Chignecto Canal Commission, the proposed Chignecto Canal was deemed commercially and economically unjustifiable and the project was abandoned. Some of the physical remnants of the 1880s project still continue to dot the landscape of Chignecto Bay today.

Chignecto Bay is derived from the Amerindian sigunikt, said to mean "foot cloth", possibly alluding to a Micmac legend.

Hydrography

At its head, Chignecto Bay itself subdivides into two basins, separated by Cape Maringouin:
Cumberland Basin - the northeast arm of Chignecto Bay (and the Bay of Fundy) between the two provinces, terminating at the Tantramar Marshes and the estuaries of the Tantramar River and Maccan River.
Shepody Bay - the north arm of Chignecto Bay and is wholly within New Brunswick. Its northern limit is formed at the estuaries of the Petitcodiac and Memramcook Rivers.

Many small named bays line the Bay's coast including Salisbury Bay at the mouths of the Upper Salmon River and Cleveland Brook, site of the Village of Alma, NB.

Chignecto Bay is a northern extension of a rift valley that forms much of the Bay of Fundy.

Toponymy
The name "Chignecto" derives from the Mi'kmaq name Siknikt, meaning "drainage place", the name of the Mi'kmaq District in which the bay is located.

Shorebird wildlife areas
The head of Cumberland Basin is an important migrating area for many shorebirds. A large portion of it is protected as a wildlife sanctuary known as the Chignecto National Wildlife Area. It includes the 10.2 km2 John Lusby National Wildlife Area, which is recognized as a Ramsar Wetland of International Importance since October 1985.

References

Bays of New Brunswick
Bays of Nova Scotia
Landforms of Cumberland County, Nova Scotia
Landforms of Westmorland County, New Brunswick
Landforms of Albert County, New Brunswick
Ramsar sites in Canada
Borders of New Brunswick
Borders of Nova Scotia